Snow In June is the third major label album by The Northern Pikes released in 1990. It featured three hit singles - "Kiss Me You Fool", "She Ain't Pretty", and "Girl With a Problem". The album features guest appearances from notable performers such as Crystal Taliefero, Garth Hudson, and John Sebastian.

Commercial performance
Snow In June was the band's most successful album, being certified Platinum in Canada, their only album to do so. It was the eighth-best selling Cancon album in Canada of 1990.

Charts
Snow In June made its debut on the Canadian Albums Chart on June 16, 1990, and stayed on the chart for over a year until September 14, 1991.

Track listing

Album credits

Personnel
Merl Bryck – vocals, guitar
Bryan Potvin – vocals, guitar
Jay Semko – vocals, bass
Don Schmid – drums, percussion

Additional personnel
Garth Hudson – organ, keyboards, accordion
John Sebastian – acoustic guitar, harp, autoharp
Stan Szelest – acoustic piano
Crystal Taliefero – background vocals
Rick Hutt – keyboards, acoustic piano
Ian Tanner – keyboards, organ

Production
Rick Hutt – producer, engineer
Fraser Hill – producer, engineer
The Northern Pikes – producers
Assisted by Chris Laidlaw
Production Assistance by Andy Horrocks & Ian Tanner
Additional Mixes by Hugh Padgham & Bob Clearmountain

References
 Liner notes from The Northern Pikes: Snow in June.

1990 albums
The Northern Pikes albums
Virgin Records albums